The 2018 ADAC TCR Germany Touring Car Championship will be the third season of touring car racing to be run by the German-based sanctioning body ADAC to the TCR regulations. The series will run predominantly in ADAC's home nation Germany. As a support category to the ADAC GT Masters series, the championship will also take in races in the neighbouring nations of Austria, the Netherlands and the Czech Republic.

Josh Files will be the defending Drivers' champion, while Target Competition will the defending Teams' champions.

Teams and drivers

Team and driver changes 
Former ADAC Procar champions YACO Racing will enter the series with a single Audi RS3 LMS TCR for Simon Reicher, who moves from Certainty Racing Team.

Wolf-Power Racing will switch from SEAT León TCR to Renault Mégane TCR for the 2018 season.

Engstler Motorsport will retain Luca Engstler and Floran Thoma. In addition the team will increase to five cars during the entire season signing Théo Coicaud, Justin Häußermann and Niko Kankkunen.

German footballer Max Kruse will set up his own team Max Kruse Racing, fielding a single Volkswagen Golf GTI TCR for Benjamin Leuchter, who returns to the series after missing out the 2017 season.

Reigning double teams' champion Target Competition withdrew from the series to join the TCR Europe Series. The team had originally signed Reece Barr to drive in the series.

Calendar and results
The 2018 schedule was announced on 30 November 2017, with three events scheduled to be held outside Germany. The championship will again run in support of the ADAC GT Masters weekends.

Footnotes

Calendar changes 
The series would make its first visit to the Czech Republic on 29 April at the Autodrom Most becoming the second round of the season.

The second round held at the Motorsport Arena Oschersleben, which supported the TCR International Series since the series' inception, was discontinued.

Drivers' Championship

Scoring systems

† – Drivers did not finish the race, but were classified as they completed over 75% of the race distance.
‡ – Half points were awarded in Race 2 at Motorsport Arena Oschersleben as less than 75% of the scheduled distance was completed.

Teams' Championship

References

External links
 

2018 in German motorsport
Germany Touring Car Championship